Palandöken is a second level municipality and ilçe (district) of Greater Erzurum, Turkey. It is named after Palandöken Mountain which is a ski resort. 

The ilçe center is at  within Erzurum. There are 26 neighborhoods in Palandöken. The total population of Palandöken was 172,337 as of 2019. 

The ice hockey venue Palandöken Ice Skating Hall was opened in 2008.

References

Districts of Erzurum Province
1993 establishments in Turkey